Prey is a 2021 German film directed and written by Thomas Sieben and starring David Kross, Hanno Koffler and Maria Ehrich. It was released by Netflix on September 10, 2021.

Cast 
 David Kross as Roman
 Hanno Koffler as Albert
 Maria Ehrich as Eva
  as Peter
 Yung Ngo as Vincent
 Klaus Steinbacher as Stefan
 Livia Matthes as Lisa
 Nellie Thalbach as Jenny

References

External links 
 
 
 Prey at Curcol.Co

2021 films
2020s German-language films
German thriller drama films
German-language Netflix original films